John Paul Chadwick Floyd, usually credited as Chad Floyd, is an American architect (born November 11, 1944) and a founding partner of Centerbrook Architects & Planners of Essex, Connecticut. Floyd’s work consists of academic, arts, civic, and residential projects. He is a member of the College of Fellows of the American Institute of Architects and a fellow of the Institute of Urban Design.

Education and early career 
Floyd graduated from Yale College in 1966 and Yale School of Architecture in 1973. He received a Winchester Fellowship from Yale and a National Endowment for the Arts grant to study celebration spaces in 1974. He has been recognized for the use of interactive techniques, including live television, to engage citizens in urban design and architecture.

Centerbrook 
Founded in 1975, Centerbrook grew out of a firm established by Charles W. Moore, formerly the Dean of the Yale School of Architecture. Centerbrook was named Firm of the Year by the American Institute of Architects in 1998.

Notable projects 
 Thompson Exhibition Building, Mystic Seaport Museum, Connecticut
 Eugene O'Neill Theater Center expansion, Connecticut
 Palmer Events Center, Texas
 Hood Museum of Art at Dartmouth, New Hampshire
 Addison Gallery of American Art, Phillips Academy Andover, New Hampshire
 Health Care REIT Headquarters, Ohio
 Krieble Gallery at Florence Griswold Museum, Connecticut
 Norton Museum of Art, Florida
 Tuck School of Business at Dartmouth College

National recognition 
 AIA Honor Award for Architecture, Hood Museum of Art, Dartmouth College, New Hampshire, 1987
 AIA Honor Award for Urban Architecture, Watkins Glen Waterfront Plan, New York, 1988
 AIA Honor Award for Architecture, Seneca Pier Pavilion, Watkins Glen, New York, 1989
 AIA Honor Award for Interiors, House in the Country, 1993
 Residential Architect Design Awards, Grand Award, Floyd House, Essex, Connecticut, 2006
 Architectural Digest, Top Architects, Adler House, 2008

References

External links 
 Centerbrook
 Addison
 Norton
 House in Massachusetts
 HC REIT Headquarters
 

1944 births
20th-century American architects
Living people
Yale College alumni
Yale School of Architecture alumni
21st-century American architects